GURPS Bio-Tech is a GURPS, the Generic Universal Role Playing Game, sourcebook that covers the implementation of biotechnology in the game. The first edition of the book was written for GURPS Third Edition,  while the second edition of GURPS Bio-Tech was written for GURPS Fourth Edition. Both editions of the game are primarily focused on providing supplemental rules, campaign material, and examples of the uses of biotechnology for the players and game-master alike. The second edition contains two outlines for campaign settings (Alexander Athanatos and Draconis) but is primarily focused on providing rules and examples of devices that Game Masters could adapt for use in their own campaigns.

GURPS is a game where players and game-masters can, and are encouraged to, create whatever characters and settings they choose. The GURPS Bio-Tech sourcebook gives them a resource to use should they wish to incorporate elements of biotechnology into their games. The books contain rules and advice for creating a wide variety of possible characters, scenarios, storylines, and campaigns that are influenced by either real-world theories and practices of biotechnology, or the science fiction of advanced genetic alteration, enhancement, and augmentation.

Author Information
The first edition of GURPS Bio-Tech was written by David L. Pulver. The second edition was written by both Pulver and David Morgan-Mar. David Pulver has written a number of books for GURPS in both its third and fourth editions. Morgan-Mar is a regular contributor to Pyramid Magazine, Steve Jackson Games' online game and hobby magazine, and has co-written several books for GURPS Fourth Edition.

Content
GURPS Bio-Tech includes a detailed introduction into biotechnology, speaking about both its practices in a real-world sense, and its applications in science fiction and fantasy. In addition to new and supplemental rules for the game, the book goes into great detail discussing what the world would (potentially) be like if biotechnology were to continue to advance. Anti-aging treatments, human (and nonhuman) augmentation and enhancement, chemical warfare, cloning, and many other subjects are detailed, along with advice for game-masters should they wish to implement such things into their games. Because GURPS is meant to be open-ended for the game-master to develop their own setting, many possibilities are left open for their interpretation, such as potential social and political ramifications of these advancements. How does the general public react to extreme modification? What religious concerns does it bring up? How does humanity deal with the population increase caused by anti-aging treatments? GURPS Bio-Tech leaves the answers to these questions up to the game-masters, allowing them to weave such elements into their stories as much or as little as they desire. This is also the first 4th edition book to make significant changes to the page layout introduced with the 4th edition, most noticeably with a return to a two column layout.

Inspiration
GURPS Bio-Tech draws inspiration from a varied collection of sources. 
David Brin's Otherness
John Varley's The Persistence of Vision
H. G. Wells' The Island of Dr. Moreau
Janine Benyus' Biomimicry: Innovation Inspired by Nature
Thomas Lee's Gene Future
and many others.

Publication history

The first edition of GURPS Bio-Tech was written by David Pulver, and published by Steve Jackson Games as a 144-page book. The first edition of GURPS Bio-Tech was written in 1997, and published by Steve Jackson Games, the creators of GURPS, the Munchkin card game, and many others.

A new GURPS Bio-Tech (2006) was one of several technology-focused books published for GURPS fourth edition. The second edition, published in 2006, was also produced by Steve Jackson Games. The first edition had two print runs, which the second edition is still on its first.

Reception
Joe Kushner reviewed the first GURPS Bio-Tech in Shadis #48. Kushner comments: "Overall the book is very clear and easy to use. The majority of the text has comments by various individuals which make it easier to read. The art is all done by Dan Smith, so even if you don't like his art, it still has a uniform feel to it."

Awards
It was an Origins Award nominee as Best Roleplaying Game Supplement in 2007.

Reviews
Backstab #8

References

External links
Homepage for second edition, for GURPS 4th edition
Errata for second edition, for GURPS 4th edition
Homepage for first edition, for GURPS 3rd edition
Errata for first edition, first printing, for GURPS 3rd edition
Errata for first edition, second printing, for GURPS 3rd edition
Pyramid magazine

Biopunk
Bio-Tech
GURPS 3rd edition
GURPS 4th edition
Role-playing game supplements introduced in 1997
Science fiction role-playing game supplements